Simon Cox may refer to:

 Simon Cox (Australian rules footballer), AFL player
 Simon Cox (car designer), British car designer
 Simon Cox (director), writer and director of Invasion Planet Earth
 Simon Cox (footballer, born 1984), English footballer
 Simon Cox (footballer, born 1987), Irish footballer
 Simon Cox (golfer) (born 1952), Welsh golfer
 Simon Cox (rower) (born 1970), British lightweight rower